Genaro Díaz Raigosa (19 April 1904 – 5 December 1963) was a Mexican bobsledder. He competed in the five-man event at the 1928 Winter Olympics. He is a relative of Mexican president Porfirio Díaz and the brother of bobsledder José Díaz.

Notes

References

External links 
 

1904 births
1963 deaths
Mexican male bobsledders
Olympic bobsledders of Mexico
Bobsledders at the 1928 Winter Olympics
Sportspeople from Mexico City